Dombivli is the all time busiest railway station on the Central line of the Mumbai Suburban Railway network. It consists of 5 Platforms and 7 Tracks. Both Fast and Slow Trains halt here.

Ticket sale data between April–July 2013 shows that the average number of passengers buying tickets at Dombivli was 2.18 lakh.

References

Railway stations in Thane district
Mumbai Suburban Railway stations
Mumbai CR railway division
Railway stations in India opened in 1887
Transport in Kalyan-Dombivli